Grant Williams may refer to:

 Grant Williams (actor) (1931–1985), American actor
 Grant Williams (American football) (born 1974), American football player
 Grant Williams (footballer) (born 1969), Australian football player
 Grant Williams (rugby union) (born 1996), South African rugby player
 Grant Williams (basketball) (born 1998), American basketball player
 Grant R. Williams (1930–1964), US Navy test pilot